The Review of Japanese Culture and Society is an annual peer-reviewed academic journal covering Japanese art, literature, and society. It publishes English translations of Japanese works and perspectives from both Japanese and international scholars. Each of its annual issues is typically on a special theme, with special editors for the issue. The journal was established in 1986. Its editor-in-chief is Noriko Mizuta.

Abstracting and indexing
The journal is abstracted and indexed in the Modern Language Association Database.

References

External links 

Annual journals
Japanese studies journals
Cultural journals
English-language journals
Publications established in 1986
University of Hawaiʻi Press academic journals